The Federation of Women's Clubs for Oklahoma and Indian Territories was formed in May, 1898.   The motto selected for the organization was "Kindliness and Helpfulness". The first president was Sophia Julia Coleman Douglas.

The charter women's clubs were:
 Philomathea Club, Oklahoma City, organized Oct. 1891
 Chautauqua Literary and Scientific Club, Guthrie, organized Oct. 1891
 Coterle Club, Norman, organized Jan. 1894
 Tuesday Afternoon, Perry, organized Sept. 1894
 Merrie Wives, Purcell, organized Feb. 1895
 Current Events, Kingfisher, organized Oct. 1895
 Matrons' Magazine, Wynnewood, organized Feb. 1896
 San Souci, Oklahoma City, organized Oct. 1896
 Browning, Stillwater, Organized Nov. 1896
 Athenaeum Club, El Reno, organized 1897
 Shakespeare Club, Guthrie, organized May, 1898

They immediately joined the General Federation of Women's Clubs (GFWC). Working under the auspices of the GFWC, the Federation of Women's Clubs for Oklahoma and Indian Territories supported the 1906 campaign for a compulsory school attendance law, which help achieve the resulting compulsory education bill that passed in 1907. They were also involved with the GFWC's "Indian Welfare Committee", working for better health care and educational facilities for Native Americans.

Beginning in 1903, some women's clubs left the Federation of Women's Clubs for Oklahoma and Indian Territories to form the Federation of Women's Clubs of Indian Territory. Membership in the Indian Territories women's clubs typically had a majority Native American membership.

Oklahoma State Federation of Women's Clubs
Oklahoma achieved statehood in 1907. In 1908 the Federation of Women's Clubs for Oklahoma and Indian Territories and the Federation of Women's Clubs of Indian Territory merged to become the Oklahoma State Federation of Women's Clubs. The first president was Frances F. Threadgill. In 1909 the newly merged club was admitted into the GFWC.

References

Women's clubs in the United States
Women's organizations based in the United States
Women in Oklahoma